Michael G. Kessler was the founder and CEO of Kessler International, a United States-based forensic accounting, computer forensics and corporate investigations firm.

Kessler's credentials included Cr.FA (Certified Forensic Accountant), CFE (Certified Fraud Examiner), CICA (Certified Internal Controls Auditor), DABFA (Diplomate with the American Board of Forensic Accountants), and FABFE (Fellow status with the American Board of Forensic Examiners).

In January 2006 Kessler was elected chairman of the American Board of Forensic Accounting, an advisory board of the American College of Forensic Examiners.

Notable investigations 
In early 2008, Kessler investigated an alleged Long Island-based Ponzi scheme masquerading as a legitimate bridge loan company, called Agape World. He alerted the FBI and other law enforcement agencies after finding evidence of a Ponzi scheme.

Shortly thereafter, the FBI and the USPIS launched their own investigation. Agape World continued to operate, but after the collapse of the Bernard Madoff Ponzi scheme, Agape World came under increased scrutiny and suspicion by investors.

In December 2008 and January 2009, Kessler received numerous reports from investors in Agape World that the payout dates for various bridge loans were being extended or not paid at all, signs that are usually indicative of a collapsing Ponzi scheme. In January 2009, Nicholas Cosmo, founder of Agape World, was arrested by authorities and is alleged to have defrauded investors of an approximate total of $370 million.

In January 2010, Kessler was hired by the city of Fort Pierce, Florida, to audit the city's Community Services Department. As a result of their work, Kessler recommended the city turn over its findings to the U.S. Attorney's Office to determine whether criminal charges should be filed.

In March 2010, the city of Deerfield Beach, Florida, hired Kessler International to audit the city's Community Grant department.

References

External links
 Kessler International

American businesspeople
Living people
Year of birth missing (living people)